Kogo-ike is an earthen dam located in Saga Prefecture in Japan. The dam is used for agriculture. The dam impounds about 5  ha of land when full and can store 317 thousand cubic meters of water. The construction of the dam was completed in 1948.

References

Dams in Saga Prefecture
1948 establishments in Japan